Alfred Grindle was a Manchester-born architect. active in Indiana in the United States. His work includes the Glossbrenner Mansion (1910) at 3202 North Meridian Street in Indianapolis.

Grindle designed several buildings in the University Courts Historic District in Bloomington, Indiana. He drew plans for 825 East Eighth Street for Indiana University football coach Ewald O. Stiehm, who let contracts and supervised construction himself.

References

Further reading

Alfred Grindle Bloomingpedia.org

Architects from Manchester
Architects from Fort Wayne, Indiana
Architects from Indianapolis
Architects from Indiana
20th-century American architects
English emigrants to the United States
1863 births
Year of death missing
People from Muncie, Indiana
People from Bloomington, Indiana